The 1930 Chattanooga Moccasins football team represented the University of Chattanooga as a member of the Southern Intercollegiate Athletic Association (SIAA) during the 1930 college football season. Led by second-year head coach Harold Drew, the Moccasins compiled and overall record of 5–3–2 with a mark of 3–2–1 in SIAA play.

Schedule

References

Chattanooga
Chattanooga Mocs football seasons
Chattanooga Moccasins football